Frank Andrés Chávez Viloria (born 6 January 2005) is a Venezuelan footballer who plays as a right-back for Zulia.

Career statistics

Club

Notes

References

2005 births
Living people
People from San Cristóbal, Táchira
People from Táchira
Venezuelan footballers
Association football defenders
Venezuelan Primera División players
Zulia F.C. players